The first table details World Championship Grand Prix results for the McLaren Formula One team. The second table includes results from privately owned McLaren cars in World Championship Grands Prix.

Formula One results

Works team entries

1960s
(key)

1970s
(key)

1980s
(key)

1990s
(key)

2000s
(key)

2010s
(key)

2020s
(key)
Notes
 * – Season still in progress.
  – The driver did not finish the Grand Prix, but was classified, as he completed over 90% of the race distance.
  – Half points awarded as less than 75% of the race distance was completed.

Customer cars
(key) (results in bold indicate pole position; results in italics indicate fastest lap)

Non-championship results
(key) (results in bold indicate pole position; results in italics indicate fastest lap)

Notes

References

Formula One constructor results
Results